is a private Catholic junior and senior high school for boys in Fujimi, Chiyoda, Tokyo. Founded in 1888, it is regarded as one of the country's most prestigious private schools. It is part of a family of Catholic schools administered by the Gyosei Gakuen Educational Association which includes a kindergarten and elementary school.

History
After Pierre-Marie Osouf became the new Bishop of Tokyo, he convinced the Society of Mary (Marianists) that there was a need for Catholic schools in Japan. The order responded generously and sent American and French missionaries, who founded Gyosei High School in Tsukiji, Tokyo in 1888. The school was affected by the devastating 1923 Great Kantō earthquake and then World War II some twenty years later.

The high school is the oldest of a family of schools located within walking distance of each other and includes a coeducational kindergarten (opened 1969) and all-boys elementary school founded in 1890, thus providing a comprehensive education for boys from ages 3 to 18. It has a special relationship with the Jesuit-run Sophia University: Gyosei High School graduates often continue on to Sophia University and it recruits religious studies teachers from the university.

Saint Joseph College in Yokohama was founded as a division of Gyosei High School before becoming a separately-run international school. It has since closed amidst much controversy.

In 1979 Gyosei International School was opened as the sister school to cater to the expatriate population. It is administered separately from Gyosei Gakuen.

Curriculum
French and English are the main foreign languages taught, the former having been taught at the school since its foundation. For a period of time, the French Baccalauréat was offered.

Alumni
Mitsuharu Kaneko – Poet/ Painter
Yohji Yamamoto – Fashion designer
Takeo Kikuchi – Fashion designer
Yoshitaro Nomura – Film director
Matsumoto Koshirō X – Kabuki performer/ Actor
Ichikawa Ennosuke IV – Kabuki performer/ Actor
Nakamura Kanzaburō XVIII- Kabuki performer/ Actor
Nakamura Kichiemon II- Kabuki performer/ Actor/ Costume designer
Matsumoto Hakuō II – Kabuki performer/ Actor
Teruyuki Kagawa – Kabuki performer/ Actor
Chiyonosuke Azuma – Actor/ Nippon buyō dancer
Tatsuo Matsumura – Actor
Kin'ya Kitaōji – Jidaigeki actor
Tōru Minegishi – Actor
Shunji Fujimura – Actor
Ayana Tsubaki – TV personality/ Fashion model
Kento Kaku – Actor
Takehiro Hira – Actor
Kentaro Ishikawa – Professional soccer player
Satoshi Okura – Professional soccer player
Takayuki Fujikawa – Professional soccer player
Yoshiyuki Kato – Professional soccer player
Kengo Tanaka – Professional soccer player
Ryoichi Maeda – Professional soccer player
Kotaro Inaba – Professional futsal player
Wataru Kitahara – Professional futsal player
Shota Hoshi – Professional futsal player
Yoshitaka Hori – CEO of Horipro
Kinnichi Shida – CEO of Shidax
Shunpei Terakawa – TV Asahi sport reporter
Hirotaka Toba – Nippon Television producer
Shirō Sagisu – Music composer
Minao Shibata – Music composer
Yoritsune Matsudaira – Music composer
Makoto Moroi – Music composer
Hideo Saito – Cellist/ Music composer
Kazumi Watanabe – Guitarist
Motoki Tokieda – Professor of Japanese linguistics at University of Tokyo
Ken'ichi Yoshida – Author/ Literary critic
Ōmi Komaki – Writer/ Translator of French literature
Ryō Kurusu – Officer in the Imperial Japanese Army

See also

 Gyosei International School, originally affiliated with this school

References

External links
 Gyosei Gakuen Educational Association (暁星学園) 
 Gyosei Junior and Senior High School 
 Marianists in Japan 

Private schools in Japan
High schools in Tokyo
Educational institutions established in 1881
1881 establishments in Japan
Marianist schools
Boys' schools in Japan
Catholic schools in Japan